(born November 27, 1990 in Satsumasendai, Kagoshima) is a Japanese football player who currently plays for Fujieda MYFC.

He was a teammate of Yuya Osako in Kagoshima Josei High School soccer club team. Their last name is same but they are not brothers.

Club career stats
Updated to 23 February 2018.

References

External links
Profile at Fujieda MYFC
Profile at Roasso Kumamoto

1990 births
Living people
Association football people from Kagoshima Prefecture
Japanese footballers
J2 League players
J3 League players
Japan Football League players
Roasso Kumamoto players
Verspah Oita players
Fujieda MYFC players
Association football midfielders